Dance Moderno is the first album by Sérgio Mendes. It is purely an instrumental album.

Track listing
 "Oba-lá-lá" (João Gilberto)
 "Love for Sale" (Cole Porter)
 "Tristeza de Nós Dois" (Durval Ferreira & Bebeto)
 "What Is This Thing Called Love?" (Cole Porter) 
 "Olhou Para Mim" (Ed Lincoln & Silvio César) 
 "Satin Doll" (Duke Ellington & Billy Strayhorn)  
 "Tema Sem Palavras" (Maurício Einhorn & Durval Ferreira) 
 "On Green Dolphin Street" (Bronislau Kaper, Ned Washington)
 "Outra Vez" (Antônio Carlos Jobim)
 "Disa" (Maurício Einhorn & Johnny Alf)
 "Nica's Dream" (Horace Silver) 
 "Diagonal" (Maurício Einhorn & Durval Ferreira)

References

Sérgio Mendes albums
1961 debut albums
Instrumental albums